The 1977 Kelantan Emergency took place in the state of Kelantan in Malaysia. The state of emergency was declared by the Yang di-Pertuan Agong, Sultan Yahya Petra who was also Sultan of Kelantan at the time on 8 November 1977 upon the request of the federal government following a political impasse and street violence in Kelantan. This was the fifth declaration of emergency in Malaya and Malaysia after the 1948-1960 Malayan Emergency, the Indonesia-Malaysia confrontation, the 1966 Sarawak constitutional crisis and the 13 May Incident.

Events leading up to the declaration of emergency
The Menteri Besar (Chief Minister) of Kelantan in 1977 was Mohamed Nasir of the Pan-Malaysian Islamic Party (PAS). At that time and since 1972, PAS was part of the Alliance Party and subsequently Barisan Nasional (BN) (after 1974), which is the federal government-ruling coalition party. In 1977, Mohamad Nasir was experiencing dissatisfaction within PAS and was accused of defying party instructions. A no-confidence motion was tabled in the state assembly wherein 20 PAS assemblymen supported the motion while the other BN's 13 United Malays National Organisation (UMNO) and 1 Malaysian Chinese Association (MCA) assemblymen walked out in protest. Mohamad Nasir refused to resign. He then requested the Regent of Kelantan (as head of state) to dissolve the state assembly to make way for an election but it was refused. Supporters of Mohamad Nasir then demonstrated in the streets resulting in violence and looting.

Declaration of emergency and aftermath
On 8 November 1977 the Yang di-Pertuan Agong, then also the Sultan of Kelantan, declared a state of emergency in the state of Kelantan. The Emergency Powers (Kelantan) Act 1977 was passed by Parliament the next day giving the federal government implied power to govern the state. Although being part of the Barisan Nasional coalition, 12 out of 14 PAS members of Parliament had opposed the passing of the Act. Consequently, PAS was expelled from the BN coalition.

During the emergency, Mohamad Nasir retained the post of Mentri Besar but with limited powers as the ultimate executive power was vested in the Director of the State Government of Kelantan which was appointed by the Prime Minister under the Emergency Powers (Kelantan) Act 1977. Hashim Aman was appointed to the interim position during the period of emergency.

In March 1978, an election was held in Kelantan, months ahead of the national election. The election was contested by PAS, UMNO and Pan-Malaysian Islamic Front (BERJASA), a new party formed by Mohamad Nasir. UMNO won the election by winning 23 seats, while BERJASA won 11 and PAS with 2 seats paving way for UMNO to form government in Kelantan for the first time.

After the election, BERJASA joined Barisan Nasional and Mohamad Nasir became a Senator and Minister without Portfolio in the federal government[1] while Mohamed Yaacob of UMNO became the new Menteri Besar of Kelantan. Mohammed Yaacob retained the post until 1990 after PAS regained control of Kelantan.

References

Riots and civil disorder in Malaysia
Political history of Malaysia
1977 in Malaysia
1978 in Malaysia
History of Kelantan
Protests in Malaysia
Pan-Malaysian Islamic Front